Augustin Andriamananoro (born 14 August 1968 in Soamahamanina, Madagascar) is the Executive Manager of the Presidency of Madagascar in charge of Presidential Projects, he was the former Minister of Halieutic Resources and Fisheries from June 2018 to January 2019.

General Manager of the Presidency of Madagascar 
After the last presidential election in Madagascar in December 2018, the President of Madagascar, Andry Rajoelina, named Augustin Andriamananoro the General Manager of the Presidency of Madagascar in charge of Presidential Projects. Madagascar is the fourth largest country in the world and the five-year plan implemented under the leadership of The President Andry Rajoelina aims above all at a growth rate of 7% of the GDP between 2019 and 2023, which will have the primary impact of reducing the poverty rate of 92% to 46%. As the executive manager of presidential projects, Augustin Andriamananoro is in charge of implementation of projects in different sectors such as access to water and energy for all, food self-efficiency, education resources and structures, extractive sector development, sports and culture, tourism and protection of environment, health and well-being, and ICT's development.

Minister of Halieutic Resources and Fisheries 
Under the Presidency of HE Hery Rajaonarimampianina, Augustin Andriamananoro was the Minister of Halieutic Resources and Fisheries from June 2018 to January 2019.
During his term, Andriamananoro had the opportunity to manage projects on reforestation of mangrove swamp, development of blue economy with an international conference on sustainable blue economy, and also projects laws were adopted by the Senate on the protection of maritimes areas for Malagasy local fishers.

ICT Project Manager 
In 1998, Andriamananoro gained experience in software engineering and information technologies while in France.  Afterwards, he engaged in numerous projects in the Caribbean and Indian Oceans. He was also the project director of Société M & Associés in Guadeloupe in 2002, as well as the General Manager of the Osmosis Business Solutions O.I. group in Antananarivo until 2008. Andriamananoro continued to serve as the General Director to the Malagasy Authority Office for the Study and Regulation of Telecommunications for Madagascar OMERT.

Andriamananoro was certified by the Galilee Institute of Management in Israël, in his capacity as ICT Senior Manager, he was also certified by EMPIM.

Public figure
In November 2009, as Minister of Telecommunications, Post and New Technology, he had the opportunity from the President of Madagascar to enable the trunk routes on fibre optic cable for the whole of East Africa, a project known as Project Lion. This would link East Africa to East Asia and Europe with submarine internet fibre-optic cables. In March 2010, the Telecom Company TELMA, at that time, laid another submarine cable in the Consortium Eassy, which is a project reliant Madagascar with East Africa, ("Consortium Project to relay Madagascar to the African continent and the wider world").

Andriamananoro ensured third-party access by other telecommunications and infrastructure operators, and established licenses for 3G Internet service, which now cover the entire country of Madagascar.

He became the Chairman of the Board to the National Shareholding Company (SONAPAR) from 10 December 2010 to December 2014.

During this time he was the official General Manager of the Authority Office on Regulation of Madagascar Telecommunications, OMERT (roughly equivalent to Ofcom in the United Kingdom or the U.S. Federal Communications Commission). He relieved his post in May 2014.

Politician
Mr Augustin Andriamananoro, a native of Soamahamanina, has been arrested, at a family funeral, by the force elements (EMMOREG) on Saturday 10 December 2016. He was imprisoned at the detention centrale of Antanimora, for opposing the illegal occupation of land (land grabs) for gold mining extraction by the Chinese company Jiuxing Mines SARL, in his home village of Soamahamanina located 68 km west of Antananarivo Madagascar.

" Vox Populi vox dei ".  Basically, it was the message that the priest of ECAR Ste Dorothée Soamahamanina passed to the faithful of this place, which had become "historical" as well as to the peers of Augustin Andriamananoro, in this case his family and the members of the MAPAR. For a mass was organized in this church to support the former Minister of Telecommunications, in particular and for the country in general.

In November 2010, Andriamananoro was promoted to be Head of the Campaign for the Constitutional Referendum for the Fourth Republic of Madagascar. With universal suffrage, he returned more than 75% of the popular vote.

In July 2013, he became one of the Vice President of MAPAR,  founded by Andry Rajoelina, who had the majority in the Parliament House, of Madagascar since 20 December 2013: in his capacity of being the state's Vice Président.

References 

Living people
1968 births
Malagasy businesspeople
Malagasy politicians
People from Itasy Region
Malagasy expatriates in France
Malagasy prisoners and detainees